The name Antiochis is the female name of Antiochus.

Women

Seleucid Princesses & Hellenistic Queen Consorts
Antiochis, a daughter of Achaeus and granddaughter of Seleucus I Nicator. She married Attalus and became the mother of Attalus I, King of Pergamon
Antiochis, a sister of Antiochus III the Great, being a daughter of Seleucus II Callinicus and Laodice II. She married Xerxes of Armenia, King of Arsamosata, a city between the Euphrates and the Tigris
Antiochis, a daughter of Antiochus III the Great and Laodice III. She married Ariarathes IV of Cappadocia, and had one daughter and two sons by him
Antiochis, concubine of Antiochus IV Epiphanes. The cities of Tarsus and Mallus were given to her as a gift and the citizens of the cities revolted. Antiochus crushed the rebellion 
Antiochis of Commagene, a daughter of Antiochus I Theos of Commagene

Physician
Antiochis of Tlos in Lycia, a 1st-century physician daughter of Diodotus (perhaps Diodotus the physician)

Athenian clan (phyle)
Antiochis, an Athenian Phyle was named Antiochis after Antiochus a mythical Attic hero. Aristides the just the son of Lysimachus, was of the tribe of Antiochis. For the subdivisions-townships of Antiochis in Attica, see deme.

See also
 Antiochianus

References

Seleucid dynasty
Ancient Greek queens consort
Hellenistic-era people
Hellenistic Cappadocia
2nd-century BC women
Pergamon
1st-century women

Armenian queens consort